Joris Grosjean (born 21 July 1993) is a French male badminton player. In 2011, he won a bronze medal at the European Junior Championships in the boys' doubles event partnered with Lucas Corvée. He and Corvée also became the runner-up at the Estonian International tournament in the men's doubles event.

Achievements

European Junior Championships
Boys' Doubles

BWF International Challenge/Series
Men's Doubles

 BWF International Challenge tournament
 BWF International Series tournament

References

External links 
 

1993 births
Living people
French male badminton players
21st-century French people